David Wilson (born 4 January 1967) is a former Australian rugby union footballer who played on the openside flank 79 times, and who captained the Wallabies 9 times.

Through his career he won every international trophy available to an Australian test player (Bledisloe Cup series wins in 1992, 94, 98, 99 & 2000 including the 1999 win as Captain), a world cup in 1999 & finally a Tri Nations series win in 2000.

Wilson was born in Brisbane, Australia. He first came to prominence in 1985 when  he was selected in the 1985 all conquering Australian Schoolboys team as Vice Captain. Before making his grade debut for Easts Tigers (Brisbane) in 1987.  After making his debut for Queensland in 1989, David was selected later the same year to tour with the Wallabies to Canada and France but it was not until 1992 when he made his debut with the Wallaby side in the home test against Scotland and was a regular starter in the national side from then on, when fit.

David was a vital part of what many consider to be the best Wallaby side of all time throughout those 1998,1999 & 2000 seasons where the team won everything on offer.

The 1999 World Cup win was followed up by Australia's first ever tri nations series win in 2000, following which he retired from test rugby.   David moved to the UK to play for NEC Harlequins in the Zurich Premiership.  A serious knee injury in the 2001 European Shield Final (Harlequins won the game 42–33 in extra time) ended Wilson's playing career at the age of 35 and he was forced to retire from the game.

External links
  Scrum.com player statistics
 Motivational Speaker's Profile
  Sporting Heroes Profile

1967 births
Living people
Australian rugby union players
Australia international rugby union players
Australian rugby union captains
People educated at Brisbane State High School
Rugby union flankers
Rugby union players from Brisbane